Procranioceras is an extinct genus of Artiodactyla, of the family Palaeomerycidae, endemic to North America. Fossils have been found from Florida,  Saskatchewan, and Nebraska.

References 

Palaeomerycidae
Miocene even-toed ungulates
Serravallian genus extinctions
Miocene mammals of North America
Prehistoric even-toed ungulate genera
Burdigalian genus first appearances
Fossil taxa described in 1937